Eaton Mountain is a small family-oriented ski area located in Skowhegan, Maine. It consist of 5 Beginner trails (28%), 7 intermediate trails (39%) and 6 expert trails (33%). Along with a double chairlift and a rope tow. It also has over 50% snowmaking and over 50% night skiing.

During November 2008, Eaton Mountain was purchased by the Beers family. With little time to make needed improvements, the decision was made to close Eaton Mountain for the 2008–09 winter ski season. The ski area was set to re-open in fall of 2009. As of January 2020 the ski area re-closed.  As of 2019, the ski area had reopened.

Terrain
Eaton has variety of terrain from gentle rolling trails like the Fawn and Badger to expert runs like the Fisher and Fox, which includes steeps, ledges, and glades.

History
The first lift, a rope tow, opened in the winter of 1961–62. Today, there is a double chair and a handle tow for snow tubing. In 2008, Eaton Mountain was purchased by the Beers family.

References

External links
Eaton Mountain Ski Area
Ski Maine Association
Eaton Mountain Info Page

Ski areas and resorts in Maine
Buildings and structures in Somerset County, Maine
Tourist attractions in Somerset County, Maine
Mountains of Somerset County, Maine
Skowhegan, Maine
Mountains of Maine